Pedro Amalio López (July 10, 1929 – June 25, 2007) was a Spanish television producer, film critic, and screenplay writer.

Awards

Grand Prize at the Festival of Berlin (1967) on its agenda a world without light.
Special mention at the Monte Carlo Television Festival (1969) to its agenda a new King Midas.
Waves Awards (1969) National Television: Best Director.
Award of the Academy of Television (1999) his entire career.

1929 births
2007 deaths